The Nightingale is a 1979 Soviet family film directed by Nadezhda Kosheverova. It is based on two stories by Hans Christian Andersen, "The Nightingale" and "The Emperor's New Clothes".

Plot 
The film tells about a poor journeyman who meets a wizard who instantly changes his life and he becomes the heir to the throne.

Cast 
 Svetlana Smirnova as Mariya
 Yuri Vasilev as Evan
 Aleksandr Vokach as Chancellor Krab (as A. Vokach)
 Zinoviy Gerdt as Boms (as Z. Gerdt)
 Nikolay Trofimov
 Aleksandr Demyanenko
 Konstantin Adashevsky
 Sergey Filippov
 Nikolay Karachentsov
 Mariya Barabanova

References

External links 
 

1979 films
1970s Russian-language films
Soviet children's films
Films based on works by Hans Christian Andersen
Works based on The Nightingale (fairy tale)
Works based on The Emperor's New Clothes
Films based on fairy tales
Films directed by Nadezhda Kosheverova